Jeremiah Streng (born 8 November 2001) is a Finnish professional footballer who plays as a striker for SJK Seinäjoki in the Veikkausliiga.

Club career
On 17 March 2022, Streng joined Forward Madison in USL League One on a season-long loan.

References

2001 births
People from Vaasa
Living people
Finnish footballers
Association football forwards
Vasa IFK players
Seinäjoen Jalkapallokerho players
HIFK Fotboll players
FF Jaro players
Forward Madison FC players
Veikkausliiga players
Kakkonen players
Ykkönen players
Finnish expatriate footballers
Expatriate soccer players in the United States
Finnish expatriate sportspeople in the United States
USL League One players